The Kaduna State Executive Council (also known as, the Cabinet of Kaduna State) is the highest formal governmental body that plays important roles in the Government of Kaduna State headed by the Governor of Kaduna State. It consists of the Deputy Governor, Secretary to the State Government, Head of Service, aides, and Commissioners who preside over ministerial departments.

Functions
The Executive Council exists to advise and direct the Governor. Their appointment as members of the Executive Council gives them the authority to execute power over their fields.

Current cabinet
The current Executive Council is serving under the Nasir Ahmad el-Rufai administration.

Principal Officers and administration

Commissioners and Agency Heads

References

Kaduna
Kaduna State
Government of Kaduna State